Ayuthia is a genus of cicadas in the family Cicadidae. There is at least one described species in Ayuthia. The type species, Ayuthia spectabile, is commonly known as the Milky Cicada, the White Cicada, or the White Ghost Cicada.

References

Further reading

External links

 

Tosenini
Cicadidae genera